Karl-Heinz Dorner (born 25 October 1979) is a retired Austrian ski jumper.

In the World Cup he finished twice among the top 30, his best result being a 21st place from Oberhof in December 1995.

External links

1979 births
Living people
Austrian male ski jumpers